Temperature in Canada varies widely from region to region. Winters can be harsh in many parts of the country, particularly in the interior and Prairie provinces, which experience a continental climate, where daily average temperatures are near , but can drop below  with severe wind chills. In non-coastal regions, snow can cover the ground for almost six months of the year, while in parts of the north snow can persist year-round. Coastal British Columbia has a temperate climate, with a mild and rainy winter.

Much of Northern Canada is covered by ice and permafrost; however, the future of the permafrost is uncertain because the Arctic has been warming at three times the global average as a result of climate change in Canada. The rate of warming has been higher across the North and in the Prairies. In the southern regions of Canada, air pollution from both Canada and the United States—caused by metal smelting, burning coal to power utilities, and vehicle emissions—has resulted in acid rain, which has severely impacted waterways, forest growth and agricultural productivity in Canada.

Averages

The following tables show the average maximum and minimum temperatures of Canada of various cities across Canada, based on the climate period from 1981 to 2010 for the months of January and July (generally the lowest and highest average temperature months, but not in every case).

The two major Canadian cities that fall outside the continental climate schema are Vancouver and Victoria. Vancouver experiences an oceanic climate, bordering warm-summer mediterranean with a marked summer dry season. Victoria, BC is the only major Canadian city entirely in a warm-summer mediterranean climate. Of the eight largest Canadian cities, Ottawa, Montreal and Toronto have the warmest summers, Winnipeg the coldest winters, while Vancouver's winters are far milder than any other large city in Canada.

In mountainous regions such as British Columbia the variety of elevations creates micro-climates with average temperatures that can vary wildly within relatively small distances. A few small towns in southern BC outside of Vancouver, for example, have a humid continental climate (Dfb) with average winter temperatures and cold snaps comparable to other parts of the country.

Central Canada and northern Canada experiences subarctic and Arctic climates, much of them arid. Those areas are not heavily populated due to the severe climate, where it drops below  on most winter days and has a very brief summer season.

Some Mountain passes in southern BC also have a subarctic or subalpine climate, creating extremely dangerous driving conditions, as drivers may be unaware of wintry road conditions when they come from nearby areas like Vancouver and Kamloops that are much warmer.

The table can be reordered by clicking on the box in each column. Places in italics are provincial capitals, bold is the national capital.

Heat, cold and frost averages

Extremes
Highest recorded June 29, 2021  Lytton, British Columbia.
Lowest recorded February 3, 1947  Snag, Yukon.

The table can be reordered by clicking on the box in each column. Places in italics are provincial capital, bold is the national capital.

Maps
Weather Stations locations in Canada.

Notes

See also

List of extreme temperatures in Canada
Weather extremes in Canada
List of cities by average temperature

References

External links
Environment Canada
Environment Canada FTP
Canada Köppen Climate Map

Climate of Canada